Adelaide Terrace is a major arterial road through the central business district of Perth, Western Australia. It runs parallel to the Swan River, linking St Georges Terrace with The Causeway.

Route description
Adelaide Terrace's eastern end is at The Causeway, adjacent to the Swan River. All intersections are traffic light controlled, except for a couple of minor streets. The road's western end joins onto St Georges Terrace, at an intersection with Victoria Avenue.

History
Adelaide Terrace has existed since the 1830s. Its name appears for the first time on maps of the Land Department in 1838. It is named after Queen Adelaide, consort of King William IV, who reigned from 1830-1837.

In the late nineteenth century, the southern side was lined by houses and properties of wealthy and powerful people in Western Australia of the time – and it earned the reputation of being the location of some of John Horgan's six hungry families.

By the late twentieth century, there were only a couple of houses from the nineteenth century remaining in the full length of the road.

Major intersections

All major intersections are traffic light controlled.
  The Causeway (State Route 5) south-east / Riverside Drive (State Route 5) south-west / Hay Street north-east. Traffic light controlled teardrop roundabout: No access from Hay Street, no access to Riverside Drive.
  Plain Street (State Route 65)
 Bennett Street
 Hill Street
 Victoria Avenue / St Georges Terrace

See also

Notes

References

 Austen, Tommy The Streets of new Perth St George Books. 1988. 
 Stannage, C. T The people of Perth : a social history of Western Australia's capital cities  Perth : Carroll's for Perth Cities Council, 1979. 

Streets in Perth central business district, Western Australia
East Perth, Western Australia
Streets in East Perth, Western Australia